Ulan-Ude Vostochny Airport (also listed as Ulan Ude East) is an airport in the Buryat Republic, Russia, located 9 km east of Ulan Ude. It services medium-size airliners. The airfield served as a bomber staging base.  There is considerable tarmac space, with three 400x125m tarmacs and a few alert revetments. 

It is home to the Ulan-Ude Aviation Plant, currently producing the Mil Mi-17 & 171 helicopters and the Sukhoi Su-25UB & Su-39 attack aircraft.

References
RussianAirFields.com

Soviet Long Range Aviation bases
Airports built in the Soviet Union
Airports in Buryatia
Buildings and structures in Ulan-Ude